Cerro Infiernillo (Mount Infiernillo) or simply Infiernillo is the name of several mountains in the Andes of Chile:

 Cerro Infiernillo, Atacama, in Atacama Region 
 Cerro Infiernillo, Valparaíso, in Valparaíso Region 
 Infiernillo, in Coquimbo Region

See also
List of mountains in the Andes